Pascal Dérame (born 25 July 1970) is a former French cyclist.

Career achievements

Major results

1990
3rd Nantes-Segré
1991
2nd Circuit de Lorraine
1993
1st Bordeaux-Saintes
1994
1st Tour du Finistère
2nd Grand Prix Gilbert Bousquet
1996
1st stage 5 Tour du Poitou-Charentes
2002
1st Grand Prix de la Ville de Lillers

Grand Tour general classification results timeline

References

1970 births
Living people
French male cyclists
Cyclists from Nantes